Antônio Carlos dos Santos Aguiar (born 22 June 1983), or simply Antônio Carlos, is a Brazilian footballer who plays for Brasiliense F.C. as a central defender.

Career
Born in Rio de Janeiro, Brazil, Antônio Carlos signed with Atlético Paranaense moving from AC Ajaccio on 27 July 2007.

Honours
Fluminense
Taça Rio: 2005
Rio de Janeiro State League: 2005

Atlético Paranaense
Paraná State League: 2009

Botafogo
Taça Guanabara: 2010, 2013
Taça Rio: 2010, 2012, 2013
Rio de Janeiro State League: 2010, 2013

References

External links 

1983 births
Living people
Brazilian expatriate footballers
Fluminense FC players
AC Ajaccio players
Club Athletico Paranaense players
Atlético Clube Goianiense players
Botafogo de Futebol e Regatas players
São Paulo FC players
Avaí FC players
Magallanes footballers
Primera B de Chile players
Expatriate footballers in Chile
Expatriate footballers in France
Campeonato Brasileiro Série A players
Ligue 1 players
Association football defenders
Footballers from Rio de Janeiro (city)
Brazilian footballers